Kalsoom Parveen  (1945 – December 2020) was a Pakistani politician who served as a member of the Senate from March 2003 until her death on 21 December 2020.

Education
She did Bachelor of Education from the Balochistan University in 1994. She held the Master of Philosophy degree in History.

Political career
She was elected to the Senate of Pakistan on a reserved seat for women as a candidate of Pakistan Muslim League (Q) (PML-Q) in the 2003 Senate election.

She ran for the seat of Senate in 2009 Pakistani Senate election as an independent candidate after she was not given ticket by PML (Q) and was successfully re-elected. She later joined Balochistan National Party Awami (BNPA).

In January 2015, she quit BNPA to join the Pakistan Muslim League (N) (PML-N) and also resigned from her seat in the Senate.

She was re-elected to the Senate of Pakistan on a reserved seat for women as a candidate of PML-N in 2015 Pakistani Senate election. She also served as president of the Chess Federation of Pakistan.

Death
Perveen died of COVID-19 during the COVID-19 pandemic in Pakistan in a hospital in Islamabad on 21 December 2020.

References

Politicians from Balochistan, Pakistan
Pakistani senators (14th Parliament)
2020 deaths
Year of birth unknown
Women members of the Senate of Pakistan
Deaths from the COVID-19 pandemic in Islamabad
University of Balochistan alumni
21st-century Pakistani women politicians